Searching for Fortune is a 2017 American independent drama directed by Joseph Matarrese and starring Brian Smolensky, Christina Moore and John Heard.

Cast
Brian Smolensky as Michael Denton Jr.
Christina Moore as Emily
John Heard as Denton Sr.
Tom Costello as Nick
Michael Kripchak as Tom
Aaron Munoz as Steve
Sam Munoz as Sal Burkowitz
Vanessa Bednar as Bo

References

External links
 

American drama films
American independent films
2010s English-language films
2010s American films